Queen Elizabeth's High School is a mixed grammar school in Gainsborough, Lincolnshire, England. The school, established in 1983, but with a timeline to 1589, is an amalgamation of the previous Gainsborough High School and Queen Elizabeth's Grammar School.

History
Although the details are unclear, Gainsborough appears to have had a small grammar school from the 15th century provided by the local clergy, where possibly several of the Pilgrim Fathers received their early education; among its alumni was John Robinson. Lessons were first held in a room above the porch of the original All Saints church. Many of the school's early records were lost during the reign of Charles I, owing to the prominent Puritan sympathies of many associated with the school who sought to avoid detection, and so had the incriminating records destroyed.

In 1589 Queen Elizabeth I granted a charter to Sir Robert Somerscale to establish Queen Elizabeth's Grammar School for boys, with the express purpose of providing an education in the classics and divinity for the sons of the emerging middle class in the town. In 1828, the Chartist poet Thomas Cooper sought to set up a rival grammar school, but failed, and saw his school absorbed by Queen Elizabeth's Grammar School.

From 1795 until 1940 Queen Elizabeth's Grammar School was located on Cox's Hill, at what is now the Hickman Hill Hotel. An equivalent grammar school for girls, Gainsborough High School, was founded in 1920. In 1940 both schools moved to the present Morton Terrace site, on which the local technical college was also based. Under the Tripartite System they became fully state grammar schools, having been fee-paying before then. The schools merged to form Queen Elizabeth's High School in 1982.
Before amalgamation Queen Elizabeth's Grammar School had 4 houses: Cox (red), Elliott (white), Hickman (Blue) and Marshall (green).

On 7 December 2012, the school was host to the BBC Radio 4 show 'Any Questions?', which was held in the Upper School Hall.

In 2013, following a lack of funding which affected most Grammar Schools, a £2 million grant from the Local Authority and a £500,000 grant from central government was given in order to expand and renovate the school. This enabled the construction of a new sports hall, a two-storey teaching block and the refurbishment of College House.

On 7 March 2014 the Sixth Form Centre was relocated to the 1872-built College House building, as the previous centre had become crowded College House has currently fallen into disrepair following the amalgamation with Gainsborough High School of which it had been part, and is yet to be fully restored to a state in which it is adequate for the functions of which the school would like to use it for.

School structure
Each year is divided into six forms.

The sixth-form generally contains approximately 125 pupils and is divided into six smaller forms.
There are six houses named after notable Britons: Austen, Brunel, Churchill, Darwin, Elgar and Scott. Each house has a colour and students must wear a tie with stripes of their house colour. Austen: gold, Brunel: purple, Churchill: blue, Darwin: green, Elgar: red, and Scott: silver. The houses compete in sporting, music, the arts and intelligence events to gather points, and there is a house champion trophy awarded to the house with the most points at the end of every academic year.

Before 2008 the houses were Frobisher, Drake, Raleigh and Grenville. After 2008 form rooms were moved into house blocks instead of year blocks to promote the new house system, and aimed to mix the year groups together to strengthen house community.

Admissions
The school annually admits 180 students into Year 7 and 125 into Year 12; around 1000 students make up the lower school (of those aged 11–16) and another 250 make up the sixth-form (16–18). Approximately 700 of those attending are girls and 500 are boys. A number of external pupils are also admitted to the sixth-form each year.

Curriculum
Pupils at Queen Elizabeth's High School usually take ten or eleven GCSE examinations in Year Eleven, and dependent on satisfactory grades can enter the sixth-form to take four A-Level qualifications. 

Music is historically important to QEHS, with the Anglican choral composer W. Stanley Vann being head of Music during the 1930s. Recent drama productions have included Return to the Forbidden Planet, Godspell and Disco Inferno.

Extracurricular activities
Cricket, rugby, football, and athletics are the main boys' sports, and hockey, netball, tennis and athletics the main girls' sports.

Inter-school matches are played against other grammar schools in Lincolnshire, and a few public schools and secondary modern schools.

Debating teams have won local competitions, including the Youth Speaks Competition, and have competed in a national competition.

Awards and recognition
An Ofsted inspection in 2008 described the school as "outstanding". The 2021 inspection however described the school as "requires improvement". League tables for Lincolnshire released by the BBC rate Queen Elizabeth's High School overall 10th: ratings based on English Baccalaureate results place the school joint ninth, for A/AS-level points per pupil third, and adjusted for Value Added nineteenth. The BBC A-Level league tables rank the school second best in Lincolnshire.

Old Gainians

Former pupils are known as Old Gainians (O.G.s).

Academia and science
Nicholas Atkin – Professor of Modern European History, University of Reading; historical biographer and author
Brian Berry- human geographer, Lloyd Viel Berkner Regental Professor and Dean of the School of Economic, Political and Policy Sciences at the University of Texas at Dallas
Edward William Binney; FRS- 19th century solicitor, geologist and palaeontologist.
Sir Halford Mackinder- British geographer and one of the founding fathers of both geopolitics and geostrategy, Scottish Unionist Party MP and one of the founders of the London School of Economics
Sir George Rolleston; FRCP, FRS- 19th century British physician and zoologist, Linacre Professor of Anatomy and Physiology at Oxford, evolutionary theorist.
Robert Smith- mathematician and music theorist, master of Trinity College, Cambridge, Plumian Professor of Astronomy and Experimental Philosophy

Arts
Jason Carter- actor, best known for his appearances in sci-fi series Babylon 5
Julia Deakin- actress, known for Holby City, Coronation Street, Hot Fuzz and Shaun of the Dead
Marina Lewycka- novelist, author of A Short History of Tractors in Ukrainian
 Stanley Vann- Head of Music (1933–39), Anglican choral composer and organist

Public Service
Angus Innes- Australian Liberal politician

Religion
 Hanserd Knollys- Head Master (c.1616–20), Puritan Particular Baptist preacher and clergyman.
James Bowling Mozley- Anglican clergyman, theologian, Oxford Movement chronicler and Regius Professor of Divinity at the University of Oxford
Thomas Mozley- Anglican clergyman and Anglo-Catholic theologian
Edward Rainbowe; DD- 17th century Anglican bishop of Carlisle, Puritan writer, Master of Magdalene College, Cambridge and Vice-Chancellor of Cambridge University
John Robinson- Puritan Congregationalist, Calvinist theologian and polemicist, and pastor to the Pilgrim Fathers
John Smyth- Puritan pastor and founder of the Baptist movement

Sport
Peter Atkinson- county cricketer for Worcestershire and Northumberland
Charles Booth- amateur soccer player with Wolverhampton Wanderers (1889–91) and Arsenal (1892–94)
Harry Davies- professional soccer player with Stoke City (1922–29, 1932–38) and Huddersfield Town (1930–32), sports journalist
John Hargreaves- minor county and List A cricketer for Suffolk (1963–1981)
Mervyn Winfield- county cricketer for Nottinghamshire (1954–66) and Lincolnshire (1970–71)

See also
Eleven-plus
Gainsborough, Lincolnshire
Grammar School (general)

References

External links
Queen Elizabeth's High School – Official Website
QEHS on google maps
QEHS on Microsoft Virtual Earth (higher resolution than Google Maps)

Queen Elizabeth's High School (Gainsborough)
1983 establishments in England
Educational institutions established in the 1580s
1589 establishments in England
Community schools in Lincolnshire
Gainsborough, Lincolnshire